The 2013 Shenzhen Open (known as 2013 Shenzhen Gemdale Open for sponsorship reason) was a tennis tournament played on outdoor hard courts. It was the inaugural edition of the Shenzhen Open, and was part of the WTA International tournaments of the 2013 WTA Tour. It took place at the Shenzhen Longgang Sports Center in Shenzhen, China, from 31 December 2012 to 6 January 2013.

Singles main draw entrants

Seeds

1 Rankings as of December 24, 2012

Other entrants
The following players received wildcards into the singles main draw:
  Chan Wing-yau
  Duan Yingying
  Zheng Saisai

The following players received entry from the qualifying draw:
  Kimiko Date-Krumm
  Anne Keothavong
  Jessica Pegula
  Stefanie Vögele

The following player received entry as lucky loser:
  Zhou Yimiao

Withdrawals
Before the tournament
  Iveta Benešová
  Jelena Janković (viral illness)
  Mirjana Lučić
  Petra Martić
  Barbora Záhlavová-Strýcová (doping)

Doubles main draw entrants

Seeds

1 Rankings are as of December 24, 2012.

Other entrants
The following pair received wildcards into the doubles main draw:
  Han Xinyun /  Zhou Yimiao
  Wang Qiang /  Varatchaya Wongteanchai

Withdrawals
During the tournament
  Hsieh Su-wei (right forearm injury)

Finals

Singles

  Li Na defeated  Klára Zakopalová 6–3, 1–6, 7–5
 It was Li's first title of the year and 7th of her career and her first in China since 2004.

Doubles

  Chan Hao-ching /  Chan Yung-jan defeated  Irina Buryachok /  Valeria Solovieva, 6–0, 7–5

References

External links
 Singles draw
 Doubles draw
 Official website

WTA Shenzhen Open
WTA Shenzhen Open
2013